LeRoy A. Stumpf (born May 29, 1944) is a Minnesota politician and former member of the Minnesota Senate. A member of the Minnesota Democratic–Farmer–Labor Party (DFL), he represented District 1, which included all or portions of Kittson, Marshall, Pennington, Polk, Red Lake and Roseau counties in the northwestern part of the state.

Background
Stumpf was born in Waverly, Minnesota.

Education
Stumpf graduated from Nazareth Hall High School, and then went on to receive a B.A. from the St. Paul Seminary in Saint Paul, Minnesota. He later received a M.P.A. from the Maxwell School of Citizenship and Public Affairs at Syracuse University in Syracuse, New York.

Minnesota House of Representatives
Stumpf served in the Minnesota House of Representatives from 1981 to 1983, representing District 1B.

Minnesota Senate
Stumpf was first elected to the Senate in 1982 and was re-elected in every subsequent election since then until he didn't seek re-election in 2016. He served as a majority whip from 1991 to 1993, and chaired the Education Committee from 1993 to 1997 and from 2009 to 2011, and the Children, Families and Learning Committee from 1997 to 2001. Stumpf announced his retirement in February 2016, saying that he would finish out the rest of the term and not run for reelection.

Electoral history

Personal life
Stumpf and his wife, Carol, are the owners of Two Fools Vineyard near Plummer.

References

External links

Minnesota Public Radio Votetracker: Senator LeRoy A. Stumpf
Project Vote Smart - Senator LeRoy A. Stumpf Profile
Follow the Money - LeRoy A. Stumpf Campaign Contributions
2008 2006 2004 2002 2000 1996

1944 births
Living people
Democratic Party Minnesota state senators
Democratic Party members of the Minnesota House of Representatives
People from Red Lake County, Minnesota
People from Wright County, Minnesota
21st-century American politicians
Maxwell School of Citizenship and Public Affairs alumni